Adriana Barbosa de Souza (April 21, 1992), better known as Drik Barbosa, is a Brazilian rapper, singer and songwriter.

Biography and career 
Born in Santo Amaro, South Zone of São Paulo, she is the eldest of the 3 daughters of Dalvanise Barbosa and Edinildo Batista. He has been composing since he was 14 years old, he got to know Rap through the "Batalha do Santa Cruz" in 2007 at the age of 15 where he presented his first rhymes, one of the most important rhyming competitions in national rap and which brought names like Projota to the music world. , Emicida, Rashid, Marcello Gugu and Flow MC, and there he received invitations from other MC's to participate in their work. In mid-2012, he released his first songs, the singles “Pra eternizar” and “Não é mais você”, which provided a small emphasis on his work, reaching new audiences.

Touted as a promising revelation of national rap, Drik was highlighted throughout 2013 by collaborating in numerous partnerships alongside the already renowned rapper Emicida, the first of which was in the song “Aos Olhos de Uma Criança”, soundtrack for the Oscar-nominated film “ O Menino e o Mundo" a children's animation made by Alê Abreu. Still in 2013, in partnership with music producer Casp (GROU) and with the participation of rapper Rafael Lira, Drik Barbosa released the single "Deixa eu te carry". In 2015, he collaborated again with rapper Emicida, this time in the song “Mandume” from the album “Sobre Crianças, Quadris, Pesadelos e Lições de Casa”, his participation in “Mandume” was a watershed in his career, drawing attention in high level projection. national. He integrated audiovisual projects on the internet, where he released two new songs, “Banho de Chuva” and “Rima Sim”. In the same period, she joined the female rap collective Rimas e Melodias alongside six other women: Mayra Maldjian, Tatiana Bispo, Karol de Souza, Stefanie, Tássia Reis and Alt Niss, with whom in 2017 she released the independent CD “Rimas & Melodias”, recorded at Red Bull studios, in São Paulo, with the participation of philosopher Djamila Ribeiro. The album launch show was presented at Circo Voador, in Rio de Janeiro. In 2017, he joined the cast of the label Laboratório Fantasma.

Filmography

Discography

Studio albums

Awards and nominations

References

Afro-Brazilian feminists
21st-century women rappers
Afro-Brazilian women singers
Brazilian hip hop musicians
Contemporary R&B singers
Brazilian pop singers
Brazilian women rappers
Pages using collapsible list with both background and text-align in titlestyle
1992 births
Living people
Musicians from São Paulo